The 1975 German Grand Prix was a Formula One motor race held at Nürburgring on 3 August 1975. It was race 11 of 14 in both the 1975 World Championship of Drivers and the 1975 International Cup for Formula One Manufacturers. It was the 37th German Grand Prix and the 34th to be held at the Nürburgring.

The race was won by Argentinian driver Carlos Reutemann driving a Brabham BT44B his first win of the season. Reutemann won by 1 minute and 37 seconds over the Williams FW04 of French driver Jacques Laffite. It was a stunning result for Laffite, his first point scoring finish in Formula One. It was also the peak result for Frank Williams Racing Cars, the first Formula One team run by British team principal, Frank Williams. While it was the team's third podium result, it was the first and only podium they would achieve in one of their own cars, having previously achieved second places at the 1969 Monaco Grand Prix and the 1969 United States Grand Prix with a customer Brabham. 46 seconds further back in third position was world championship points leader, Niki Lauda driving a Ferrari 312T.

With Emerson Fittipaldi's McLaren M23 retiring with suspension damage, Lauda was able to expand his points lead to 17 points with Reutemann moving back into second place.

Qualifying summary 
The pole position time set by Niki Lauda (6:58.6) was the fastest officially timed lap ever on that track configuration, though it was not eligible as lap record as it did not occur during the race. Lauda's average speed was 122.238 mph (196.289 km/h). In qualifying, Ian Ashley had an accident at Pflanzgarten and suffered serious ankle injuries. Additional Armco and other safety measures were added to the track at the drivers' demands.  The average speed remains the fastest lap average speed for any race on the Nordschleife.

Behind Lauda on pole was Carlos Pace in a Brabham, Jody Scheckter and Patrick Depailler in the Tyrrell cars, Clay Regazzoni in the second Ferrari, Jochen Mass in a McLaren, Hans-Joachim Stuck in a March, Emerson Fittipaldi in the other McLaren, James Hunt in his Hesketh and Carlos Reutemann in the second Brabham.

Race summary 
At the start, Lauda took the lead from pole with Pace, Depailler, Mass, Regazzoni and Reutemann who made a lightning start from 10th. Depailler passed Pace at the Nordkurve left hander. At the end of the first lap, the order was Lauda, Depailler, Pace, Reutemann, and Regazzoni. Scheckter had a terrible start, he dropped to 20th and began to work his way through the field. It was a bad day for the McLaren team, as sixth-placed Fittipaldi had a puncture and retired on lap 4 with damaged suspension; and Mass had lost a wheel at the Fuchsröhre (Foxhole) and crashed heavily, he was unhurt. March's day went rapidly south too: Stuck retired with engine failure on the fourth lap.

Regazzoni got past Reutemann on the third lap, and the order by the start of the fourth lap was Lauda, Depailler, Pace, Regazzoni, Reutemann, and Hunt. Lauda and Depailler battled and began to pull away from the other front-runners, and this battle raged on until the 7th lap, when Depailler had a puncture and went into the pits to repair his rear suspension; he went out again, but had lost a lap- which at the old Nürburgring, was more than 7 minutes of lost time. Pace went off with a puncture and damaged his suspension, he retired near the Karrusell on the 6th lap, and Scheckter- who had climbed to 6th, crashed out on the 8th lap. 

Depailler and Pace's misfortunes allowed Regazzoni to come up to 2nd and make it a Ferrari 1–2, but then Regazzoni's engine failed and Reutemann took 2nd, with Hunt 3rd, Tom Pryce in the Shadow 4th and Jacques Laffite in the Williams in 5th (who started 17th and 15th respectively). But on the 10th lap, Lauda too suffered a puncture of his right front tire, and Reutemann was able to pass him at the Eiskurve and Hunt was able to get by as well later on. By the time Lauda had reached the pits, his car had sustained damage to the front spoiler, and the handling was made poor. The Ferrari team changed the damaged tire (pit stops in those days were extremely slow compared to today's pit stops; races were usually run on one set of tires). By the time the Ferrari team had finished their work, Lauda stormed out of the pits; but Reutemann and Hunt were out of sight; Pryce and Laffite had passed him, too.

Lauda charged after the 4 runners ahead of him and he climbed to 4th after Hunt had a wheel-hub failure and retired on the 11th lap; and then he was able to inherit 3rd after he passed Pryce, who had fuel leaking into his cockpit and could not drive at race pace. Reutemann, who was almost 2 minutes ahead of Laffite, who was nearly a minute ahead of Lauda – held onto the lead to record his only victory of the year; and became the first (and so far last) Argentine driver since Juan Manuel Fangio to win the German Grand Prix. Laffite finished second, which equalled the struggling Williams team's highest ever finish with Piers Courage in 1969; and Depailler, whom Lauda had been fighting for the lead with earlier and was a lap down in 9th place- caught up to and started to push Lauda and attempted unsuccessfully to unlap himself; he finished close behind Lauda's ill-handling 3rd-placed Ferrari. Pryce finished an excellent 4th, followed by Australian future world champion Alan Jones in Graham Hill's Embassy-Hill car, with Dutch Le Mans winner Gijs Van Lennep in an Ensign rounding out the last points finishing slot in 6th place.

With his victory, Reutemann moved into 2nd place in the championship, 1 point ahead of Fittipaldi, but 17 points behind Lauda; and with only 3 races left in the championship, Lauda's first championship looked to be virtually a lock.

Classification

Qualifying 

*Positions in red indicate entries that failed to qualify.

Race

Championship standings after the race

Drivers' Championship standings

Constructors' Championship standings

References

German Grand Prix
German Grand Prix
German Grand Prix
Sport in Rhineland-Palatinate